There were two ships in the German Imperial Navy named SMS Königsberg:

  - a  light cruiser launched in 1905
  - a  light cruiser launched in 1916

After World War I, the Imperial Navy became the Reichsmarine.

 A third German light cruiser named  was launched in 1927.

German Navy ship names